Terry McDermott (born 1951) is an English ex-footballer, most notably with Liverpool F.C..

Terry McDermott may also refer to:
 Terry McDermott (actor) (1928-2018) Australian actor known for his role in the TV series Homicide
 Terry McDermott (baseball) (born 1951), baseball player for the 1972 Los Angeles Dodgers
 Terry McDermott (journalist), journalist and author of Perfect Soldiers, about the 9/11 hijackers
 Terry McDermott (singer), member of Scottish band Driveblind, the US band Lotus Crush and runner-up in the third season of the American The Voice series
 Terry McDermott (speed skater) (born 1940), American speed skater